The 1946–47 Soviet Championship League season was the first season of the Soviet Championship League, the top level of ice hockey in the Soviet Union. There were 12 teams in the league, 8 of which were associated with the army or police. The season began on December 22, 1946 and lasted until January 20, 1947. Dynamo Moscow won the championship.

First round

Group A

Group B

Group C

Final round

4th-8th place

References

External links
Season on hockeystars.ru

Soviet
Soviet League seasons
1946–47 in Soviet ice hockey